Caprice is a 2015 French romantic comedy film written and directed by Emmanuel Mouret, and starring Mouret,  Virginie Efira, Anaïs Demoustier and Laurent Stocker. Set in Paris, it follows the misadventures of a young teacher who is in love with a famous stage actress but is himself adored by a vivacious aspirant actress. It won the award for Best Film at the 2015 Cabourg Film Festival.

Plot
Clément, a teacher in a primary school, is divorced and on his own. He shares his worries with his headmaster Thomas, whose wife has left him. In the evenings Clément likes to go to the theatre, and in particular to plays featuring Alicia. Her regal beauty and rare acting ability can reduce him to secret tears, which are noticed by the girl in the next seat, She is Caprice, a cheerful would-be actress who also delivers pizzas.

Thomas gets a request for a sympathetic teacher to tutor a youngster, and offers the job to Clément. It is for Alicia's nephew, who is staying in the elegant house where she lives alone. She comes to appreciate his shy charm and strong rapport with children, while he is already in love with her from her stage performances. Things end with Clément moving in.

Going out for drinks with the lonely Thomas, he and Thomas are chatted up by two girls, who turn out to be Caprice and her flatmate. Things end with Clément leaving Caprice's bed at dawn to sneak back into Alicia's. He is seen by the servant who, to Alicia's alarm, leaves. Clément then admits his lapse and is banished to the spare room. Out drinking with theatre friends, Alicia sees Thomas and, when the bars shut, things end with her taking him into the theatre to raid the manager's drinks cupboard. Both conceal their night together from Clément.

Unwilling to accept that Clément can shut her out of his life after one tender night, Caprice keeps finding reasons to contact him. While Alicia is away on a long tour, he breaks a leg in an accident and Caprice looks after him, despite him refusing to be unfaithful again. When he tells her firmly that he is not going to see her any more, she takes an overdose. Going to the hospital, Clément finds that she has a male friend who will look after her.

Back in Alicia's favour, she takes up a play that he started and Caprice improved, which proves to be a success. The prominent actress and the upcoming playwright lead a brilliant life, and Thomas' wife comes back to him. Nobody knows what's happened to Caprice.

Cast 
 Virginie Efira as Alicia  
 Anaïs Demoustier as Caprice  
 Laurent Stocker as Thomas 
 Emmanuel Mouret as Clément 
 Michaël Cohen as Le comédien au théâtre 
 Thomas Blanchard as Jean 
 Mathilde Warnier as Virginie   
 Olivier Cruveiller as Maurice    
 Botum Dupuis as Christie 
 Néo Rouleau as Jacky 
 Léo Lorléac'h as Victor

Reception 
In France, the film averages 3.5/5 on the AlloCiné from 29 press reviews.

References

External links 
 

2015 films
2015 romantic comedy films
2010s French-language films
French romantic comedy films
Films directed by Emmanuel Mouret
2010s French films